Altin Masati is an Albanian retired footballer who played in his career as a left-sided defender for a series of Romanian clubs in the '90s.

Club career
According to some sources he holds the record of the longest spell in Romanian football for a foreign player, having spent 10 years there. Also, a top of the foreign players with the most appearances in the Romanian Liga II rates him second with 96 games for Tractorul Brașov and FC Onești. In the 1999–2000 season he played in the Romanian Liga I with FC Onești, scoring a goal in Round 29 against Rocar București. Since 2000 he returned in Albania and opened a luxurious restaurant in the city of Berat.

References

Year of birth missing (living people)
Sportspeople from Berat
Place of birth missing (living people)
Living people
Association football defenders
Albanian footballers
FK Tomori Berat players
ASC Oțelul Galați players
Albanian expatriate footballers
Expatriate footballers in Romania
Albanian expatriate sportspeople in Romania